Investigation Held by Kolobki (translit. Sledstvie vedut kolobki) is a series of Soviet animated shorts by Alexander Tatarsky and Igor Kovalyov that were produced from 1986 to 1987.

The first two shorts were produced by Soyuztelefilm in 1986, whereas the third and fourth shorts were produced by Studio Ekran in 1987.

After the shorts were released, the Pilot Brothers duo came to be heavily used by Tatarskiy's studio, Pilot TV, particularly in the series The Fruttis Attic and The Academy of Our Mistaks [sic].

The name of the series of shorts is a pun on a once-popular Soviet television series Investigation Held by ZnaToKi.

Plot summary 

A foreign smuggler named Karbophos (an allusion to Karabas Barabas, though also a Soviet term for Malathion insecticide), under the guise of a tourist, steals a rare striped elephant—named Baldakhin—from a city zoo in Berdychev. Previously, Karbophos had been the owner of Baldakhin, but due to his abuse of the elephant, it fled from him. The renowned Kolobki brothers—a detective duo—take up the investigation.

At a souvenir shop, Karbophos obtains a certificate for a porcelain elephant that he purchases (and then promptly breaks). He attempts to use said certificate to board a aeroplane with Baldakhin.

However, the Kolobki brothers manage to arrive in the nick of time, and lure the elephant away with cod-liver oil. Karbophos is eventually shot with a balloon gun, and flies away. The Kolobki brothers and Baldakhin (along with a turncoat ex-servant of Karbophos) then walk through the city.

Voice cast 

 Leonid Bronevoy as Chief (in the first two shorts)
 Michael Evdokimov as Chief (in the second two shorts)
 Aleksey Ptitsin as Colleague
 Stanislav Fedosov as all of the other characters

Pilot Brothers

Trivia 
 On August 9, 2018, an English version of the cartoon was posted on the Gosteleradiofond YouTube channel.

References

External links 

 

1986 films
1987 films
Films based on works by Eduard Uspensky
Soviet animated films
Studio Ekran films
Films directed by Igor Kovalyov